Tomaso Spinola (Genoa, 1557 - Genoa, 1631) was the 90th Doge of the Republic of Genoa.

Biography 
According to the annals of the Republic, the Dogate of Tomaso Spinola was somewhat peaceful and of ordinary administration. However, on 11 November 1614, he had to face a severe storm that conspicuously damaged the Port of Genoa by providing for the necessary reconstruction works of the piers and docks. The mandate ended on April 21, 1615, and he was subsequently elected as perpetual prosecutor. Spinola died in Genoa in 1631.

See also 

 Republic of Genoa
 Doge of Genoa
 House of Spinola

References 

17th-century Doges of Genoa
1557 births
1631 deaths